4EB FM is an ethnic community radio station broadcasting to the Brisbane, Queensland area. Its output is multicultural, facilitating over 55 language groups from around the world.

Language Program

See also
 List of radio stations in Australia
 The Wire, an Australian current affairs program broadcast through the Community Radio Satellite

References

Radio stations in Brisbane
Community radio stations in Australia
Radio stations established in 1979